The teams competing in Group 2 of the 2004 UEFA European Under-21 Championships qualifying competition were Romania, Denmark, Norway, Bosnia and Herzegovina and Luxembourg.

Standings

Matches
All times are CET.

Goalscorers
7 goals

 Tommy Bechmann
 Azar Karadas

4 goals
 Thomas Augustinussen

3 goals
 Morten Gamst Pedersen

2 goals

 Dragan Blatnjak
 Duško Stajić
 Thomas Kahlenberg
 Jan Kristiansen
 Ardian Gashi
 Trond Fredrik Ludvigsen
 Jan Gunnar Solli
 Kristian Ystaas
 Octavian Chihaia
 Ciprian Marica

1 goal

 Albin Pelak
 Želimir Terkeš
 Leon Andreasen
 Dennis Cagara
 Tom Christensen
 Patrick Mtiliga
 Allan Olesen
 Michael Silberbauer
 Dan Thomassen
 Simen Brenne
 Ştefan Grigorie
 Daniel Opriţa

1 own goal

 Haris Tahirović (playing against Denmark)
 Yannick Loose (playing against Denmark)

External links
 Group 2 at UEFA.com

Group 2
Under